Itasuchus is an extinct genus of crocodylomorph from the Late Cretaceous of Brazil. Fossils of the type species I. jesuinoi, first described in 1955 by Llewellyn Ivor Price, have been found from the Serra da Galga Formation (Maastrichtian age) in Uberaba, Brazil.

It is known from a 370 mm skull, suggesting a total length of about 3 m (10 ft).

References 

Terrestrial crocodylomorphs
Late Cretaceous crocodylomorphs of South America
Maastrichtian life
Cretaceous Brazil
Fossils of Brazil
Marília Formation
Fossil taxa described in 1955
Prehistoric pseudosuchian genera